"God's Plan" is a song recorded by Canadian rapper Drake, released on January 19, 2018, through Young Money and Cash Money. The song was written by Drake, Brock Korsan, and producers Cardo, Yung Exclusive, Boi-1da and Noah "40" Shebib. It acts as a single from his second EP, Scary Hours (2018), and the lead single from his fifth studio album, Scorpion (2018). Musically, it has been described as pop, pop-rap, and trap, with lyrics addressing Drake's fame and fate.

"God's Plan" received lukewarm reviews from music critics, who called it a typical Drake song. Commercially the song became the 29th song in history to debut at number one on the US Billboard Hot 100, making it Drake's fourth chart-topper in that country, and second as a lead artist. The single topped the charts in fourteen countries, including the UK and Canada and reached the top ten in nine others. The song broke first-day streaming records on both Apple Music and Spotify, and was the most streamed song of the year on both services.

An accompanying music video for the song was directed by Karena Evans and uploaded onto Drake's official YouTube channel on February 16, 2018. In the video, Drake is giving away nearly one million U.S. dollars to people and institutions in Florida. It received five nominations at the 2018 MTV Video Music Awards, including for Video of the Year and three nominations at the 61st Grammy Awards for Record of the Year, Song of the Year, and Best Rap Song, winning the latter.

Background and composition
The song creation started in September 2017 after Cardo sent Drake the instrumental. The song, originally titled "Grace of God", was chosen from a series of beats sent to Drake in September. Drake apparently called up Cardo and said "We got one" before the production of the record itself began fully.

"God's Plan" was written by Aubrey Graham, Ronald LaTour, Daveon Jackson, Matthew Samuels, and Noah Shebib and produced by Cardo, Yung Exclusive, and Boi-1da. The original instrumental for "God's Plan" was sent to Drake in September 2017 by Cardo.  Cardo created the instrumental with FL Studio and some VSTs. Boi-1da's addition to the song came when Drake gave him "God's Plan" half finished, Drake requested the song to have a more "bouncy vibe" and Boi-1da added more drums to the production. Musically the song has been described as a pop, pop-rap and trap song composed in common time ( time) with a length of three minutes eighteen seconds and written in the key of E minor with a tempo of 154.4 (or 77.2) beats per minute and a common chord progression of Am–Bm.

Following the release of his fourth studio album Views (2016) and his playlist More Life (2017), Drake did not release any music for eight months until the EP Scary Hours on January 19, 2018, following multiple leaks, like for "Pistols". "God's Plan", was first teased on January 1, 2018, at a New York New Year's Eve Party, and originally featured American rapper Trippie Redd. Redd had been talking about the collaboration since October 2017.

Release and reception
"God's Plan" was released alongside "Diplomatic Immunity" as a part of the Scary Hours EP and made available for digital download and streaming on January 19, 2018, by Young Money Entertainment and Cash Money Records. It then also became the lead single for his fifth studio album, Scorpion (2018).

The song launched with the largest on-demand streaming count in history, breaking Apple's first-day streaming record upon release with 14 million streams and breaking Spotify's single-day streaming record with 4.3 million plays in twenty four hours. The song was streamed 82.4 million times in its first week.

Talking about the song, Noisey said; "This is a good song that I've heard Drake do about 600 different versions of" before going on to say "I want to hear something different from Drake for a change, and this is definitely not what I would have hoped for."
Pluggedin had mixed views on the track, calling it "schizophrenic in nature as it zigzags back and forth between various topics."

Upon release of the music video, where Drake gave away nearly $1 million worth of gifts, a meme began circulating on Twitter praising daily, random acts of kindness.

Commercial performance
In the United States, "God's Plan" debuted at number one on the Billboard Hot 100 on the chart dated February 3, 2018, becoming Drake's fourth Hot 100 number-one song. It achieved 82.4 million streams and 127,000 downloads in the country, in the week ending January 25. "God's Plan" held steady at number one for its second week on the chart, gaining 83.3 million streams. In the end of February "God's Plan" became the second song in the Hot 100's history to achieve more than 100 million weekly streams. The single topped the Hot 100 for 11 weeks, becoming the 24th song in the history of the chart to do so. It was later unseated on the issue date April 21, 2018 by Drake's follow-up single "Nice for What". The song is also the fourth to have spent at least its first eleven weeks on the chart at number one, and the first since "One Sweet Day" in 1996. "God's Plan" ultimately spent 26 weeks in the top ten and left the chart after 36 weeks. The single would go on to top the Billboard Hot 100 Year–End chart.  It became the most-streamed song of 2018 in the United States, with 1,565,711,000 on-demand streams (918.87 million audio and 647.84 video). It was also the second best-selling digital song of 2018 with 1,056,000 copies sold, behind Ed Sheeran's "Perfect".

In the United Kingdom, "God's Plan" debuted at the top of the UK Singles Chart on January 26, 2018, for the week ending date February 1, 2018 after appearing to be first in the midweek singles chart. Drake had suddenly charted in what was expected to be a close race between Eminem and Ed Sheeran's "River" and Ramz's "Barking". "God's Plan" became Drake's third UK number one and had achieved 6.5 million streams in its first week and 54,000 sales. Hugh McIntyre of Forbes wrote that the song "shockingly debuted at No.1 across the pond, proving Drake to be an artist with unparalleled power." In its second week on the UK Singles Chart, "God's Plan" achieved 60,000 sales with 50,000 coming from streams, retaining its position at number one. "God's Plan" faced competition in its third week as its sales decreased 7% with Rudimental's "These Days" only 5,000 sales behind. Despite this, "God's Plan" was able to once again retain its position as number one and was certified Silver by the BPI. "God's Plan" stayed at number one for nine consecutive weeks in the UK, seven of which kept "These Days" by Rudimental at number two, until it became subject to accelerated chart ratio (ACR). The single was the second best-performing song on the British single charts, accumulating 1,56 million single-equivalent units. It was the most streamed song of the year, with 147 million.

Music video

An accompanying music video for the track was uploaded onto Drake's official YouTube channel on February 16, 2018. The Karena Evans-directed music video was filmed by cinematographer Jordan Oram in Miami on February 5, 2018.

The shooting for the video attracted significant media attention due to Drake donating $175,000 during the filming of the video to random Miami residents. The video depicts Drake in Miami engaging in acts of charity like gifts in kind, cash handouts and money donation through oversized cheques. Parts of the video were filmed at the Miami Senior High School in West Flagler. The video's opening states that its entire budget of $996,631.90 had been given away. At the University of Miami, Drake presented Destiny James, a young woman raised by a single mother in South Carolina, with a $50,000 oversized cheque for tuition fees for a Master's degree in public health. The same gimmick was used in 2004 by Sarah McLachlan in her song World is on Fire.

As of September 2020, the music video has received more than 1.2 billion views and is the 31st most-liked video on YouTube. NFL wide receiver Antonio Brown is shown in the video dancing with Drake.

Awards and nominations

Charts

Weekly charts

Monthly charts

Year-end charts

Decade-end charts

All-time charts

Certifications

Release history

See also
 List of most expensive music videos
 List of most-streamed songs on Spotify
 List of number-one singles of 2018 (Australia)
 List of number-one urban singles of 2018 (Australia)
 List of Canadian Hot 100 number-one singles of 2018
 List of number-one hits of 2018 (Denmark)
 List of number-one hits of 2018 (Germany)
 List of number-one singles of 2018 (Ireland)
 List of number-one hits of 2018 (Italy)
 List of number-one singles from the 2010s (New Zealand)
 List of number-one songs in Norway
 List of number-one singles of 2018 (Portugal)
 List of number-one singles of the 2010s (Sweden)
 List of UK Singles Chart number ones of the 2010s
 List of UK R&B Singles Chart number ones of 2018
 List of Billboard Hot 100 number-one singles of 2018
 List of number-one digital songs of 2018 (U.S.)
 List of number-one R&B/hip-hop songs of 2018 (U.S.)
 List of Billboard Rhythmic number-one songs of the 2010s
 List of number-one Billboard Streaming Songs of 2018

References

External links
"Drake's 'God's Plan' Video Makes Generosity Into Entertainment" on The Atlantic
"5 religious leaders weigh in on Drake's version of God's plan" on thefader.com

2018 songs
2018 singles
Billboard Hot 100 number-one singles
Canadian Hot 100 number-one singles
Drake (musician) songs
Cash Money Records singles
Republic Records singles
Young Money Entertainment singles
Irish Singles Chart number-one singles
Number-one singles in Australia
Number-one singles in Denmark
Number-one singles in Germany
Number-one singles in Greece
Number-one singles in Italy
Number-one singles in New Zealand
Number-one singles in Portugal
Number-one singles in Sweden
UK Singles Chart number-one singles
Songs written by Boi-1da
Songs written by 40 (record producer)
Songs written by Cardo (record producer)
Songs written by Drake (musician)
Trap music songs
Number-one singles in Norway
Pop-rap songs
Canadian pop songs
Internet memes introduced in 2018